Nancy Sullivan (born October 17, 1969) is an American actress, comedian, writer and television presenter, who is best known for her role as Audrey Parker-Nichols on the Nickelodeon sitcom Drake & Josh.

Career
Before she became an actress, she received improvisation training as a member of The Groundlings in San Jose. She studied acting and dance at the University of Utah. Her role models are Lucille Ball, Tracey Ullman, and Carol Burnett. She rose to fame for playing Audrey Parker-Nichols in the hit Nickelodeon sitcom Drake & Josh. On The Amanda Show, she played various characters such as Marcy Stimple, Mrs. Klutz, Ms. DeBoat, and other various teachers, as well as adult defendants in "Judge Trudy" and customers for "Blockblister" and "...Dooper" sketches.

Sullivan has also appeared in many commercials including Price Chopper supermarket chain and the Consumer Cellular wireless carrier.

Filmography

Film

Television

Video games

Bibliography 
 Threat of Exposure (2002)

References

External links
 

American film actresses
American television actresses
Living people
University of Utah alumni
American sketch comedians
20th-century American comedians
21st-century American comedians
Place of birth missing (living people)
20th-century American actresses
21st-century American actresses
Year of birth missing (living people)